Sanjawi, also spelled Sanzawi or Sinjawi, is a town in Balochistan, Pakistan, with a population of 94,000. It serves as the capital of Sanjawi Tehsil – an administrative subdivision of Ziarat District.

Pashto, as well as Wanetsi (Tareeno),[Nasari]  means Nasir tribe which is a unique and archaic dialect of Pashto, are spoken in the town.

Sanjawi is a beautiful city because of the greenery and different fruits.

Notable people
Arman Loni
Wranga Loni

References

Populated places in Ziarat District